Plainsboro Township is a township in Middlesex County in the U.S. state of New Jersey. The township is centrally located in the Raritan Valley region and is a part of the outer-ring suburbs of the New York metropolitan area even though it is geographically slightly closer to Center City, Philadelphia than Midtown Manhattan. As of the 2020 United States census, the township's population was 24,084, an increase of 1,085 (+4.7%) from the 2010 census count of 22,999, which in turn reflected an increase of 2,784 (+13.8%) from the 20,215 counted in the 2000 census.

Plainsboro was incorporated as a township on May 6, 1919, from lands north of Plainsboro Road and Dey Road that had been part of South Brunswick Township and lands south of Plainsboro Road and Dey Road that had been part of Cranbury Township. The main impetus towards the creation of the township was the lack of schools serving the area; a new school was constructed after the township was established, which still exists as J.V.B. Wicoff School, named for one of the individuals who led the effort to create Plainsboro.

History
The original residents of Plainsboro were the Unami people, a subtribe of the Lenape Native Americans. In the 17th century, the Dutch settled the area for its agricultural properties.

The oldest developed section of Plainsboro is at the intersection of Dey and Plainsboro Roads.  It is thought that the road was named after a Dutch-built tavern that sat at the intersection, called "The Planes Tavern," in the early 18th century or earlier. The building still stands and was featured on HGTV's If These Walls Could Talk along with the historic Plainsboro Inn building (circa 1790) that was built adjacent to "Planes Tavern" at Plainsboro Road and Dey Road.

In 1897, the Walker-Gordon Dairy Farm opened up, which, among many other things, contributed Elsie the Cow, possibly the most famous cow ever, and The Walker Gordon Diner, which has since been closed. The site of the farm has been turned into a single-family home community named Walker-Gordon Farm, which consists of over 350 homes.

Other family farms arrived during the first three quarters of the 20th century, notably the Parker, Simonson, Stults, and Groendyke farms.  The Parker Farm was eventually integrated into the Groendyke farm, and both became part of Walker-Gordon's Dairy Farm, which is now a housing development.  The Simonson and Stults Farms still stand and operate in Plainsboro.

Plainsboro was officially founded on May 6, 1919, and was formed from sections of Cranbury and South Brunswick townships. Plainsboro Township was created in response to Cranbury and South Brunswick refusing to build a new fireproof and larger school in Plainsboro Village. Every year, the date is celebrated with a parade, festival, and a concert.

In 1971, Princeton University (which owned most of the township) and Lincoln Properties, Inc., together started to develop the area into what it is now, a large suburban township still holding on to its rural past. In response to the development, West Windsor-Plainsboro High School South was opened in nearby Princeton Junction, then just called WWP High. To accommodate the additional growth, West Windsor-Plainsboro High School North was opened in Plainsboro in September 2000, beginning a north–south rivalry between the Pirates and the Knights.

The latest addition to Plainsboro is the Village Center, which is adjacent to the historic village area. Located at the intersection of Schalks Crossing and Scudder Mills Roads, Plainsboro Village Center currently features eight buildings totaling almost  of retail, commercial and office space, as well as 11 single-family homes and 12 townhomes. The Village Center contains wide landscaped sidewalks and outdoor, cafe'-style seating. The Village center's downtown atmosphere is the location of many shopping and dining destinations. The Village Center features a large village green with a tranquil fountain and walking paths in a park-like setting. The Village Center also houses a new $12.4 million Plainsboro Library, which opened on April 10, 2010. The township broke ground on July 27, for two new buildings that will host medical offices, additional retail space and eight residential condominium units.

A new hospital facility was under development in Plainsboro, that would be renamed University Medical Center of Princeton at Plainsboro. The new hospital and  medical campus was designed to include a modern medical office building attached to the hospital, a world-class education center, a health and fitness center, a skilled nursing facility, a pediatric services facility and a  public park. Constructed at a cost of $523 million, the new hospital opened in May 2012, with patients relocated from the former facility in Princeton that had been in use for 93 years. The hospital was acquired in January 2018 by University of Pennsylvania Health System and renamed as Penn Medicine Princeton Medical Center.

Geography
According to the United States Census Bureau, the township had a total area of 12.11 square miles (31.37 km2), including 11.74 square miles (30.40 km2) of land and 0.37 square miles (0.97 km2) of water (3.09%).

Plainsboro Center (with a 2010 Census population of 2,712) and Princeton Meadows (13,834 as of 2010) are unincorporated communities and census-designated places (CDPs) located within Plainsboro Township.

Other unincorporated communities, localities and place names located partially or completely within the township include Aqueduct, Schalks and Scotts Corner.

The township borders the municipalities of Cranbury and South Brunswick in Middlesex County; and East Windsor Township, Princeton and West Windsor Township in Mercer County.

Demographics

2010 Census

The Census Bureau's 2006–2010 American Community Survey showed that (in 2010 inflation-adjusted dollars) median household income was $86,986 (with a margin of error of +/− $5,536) and the median family income was $114,457 (+/− $6.162). Males had a median income of $76,846 (+/− $6,185) versus $58,515 (+/− $5,722) for females. The per capita income for the township was $46,222 (+/− $2,054). About 1.9% of families and 3.9% of the population were below the poverty line, including 3.6% of those under age 18 and 4.0% of those age 65 or over.

2000 Census
As of the 2000 United States census there were 20,215 people, 8,742 households, and 5,122 families residing in the township. The population density was 1,707.7 people per square mile (659.2/km2). There were 9,133 housing units at an average density of 771.5 per square mile (297.8/km2). The racial makeup of the township was 58.20% White, 7.58% African American, 0.10% Native American, 30.51% Asian, 0.01% Pacific Islander, 1.36% from other races, and 2.24% from two or more races. Hispanic or Latino of any race were 4.64% of the population.

As part of the 2000 Census, 16.97% of Plainsboro Township residents identified themselves as being Indian American. This was the second-highest percentage (behind Edison) of Indian American people in any municipality in the United States with 1,000 or more residents identifying their ancestry. In the 2000 census, 8.55% of Plainsboro Township's residents identified themselves as being of Chinese ancestry. This was the second-highest percentage (behind Holmdel Township) of people with Chinese ancestry in any municipality in New Jersey with 1,000 or more residents identifying their ancestry.

There were 8,742 households, out of which 33.4% had children under the age of 18 living with them, 50.4% were married couples living together, 6.4% had a female householder with no husband present, and 41.4% were non-families. 33.9% of all households were made up of individuals, and 2.2% had someone living alone who was 65 years of age or older.  The average household size was 2.30 and the average family size was 3.06.

In the township the population was spread out, with 24.6% under the age of 18, 6.5% from 18 to 24, 45.2% from 25 to 44, 19.4% from 45 to 64, and 4.2% who were 65 years of age or older.  The median age was 33 years. For every 100 females, there were 102.4 males.  For every 100 females age 18 and over, there were 100.8 males.

The median income for a household in the township was $72,097, and the median income for a family was $88,783 (these figures had risen to $82,609 and $102,586 respectively as of the 2007 American Community Survey estimate). Males had a median income of $62,327 versus $44,671 for females. The per capita income for the township was $38,982.  About 1.4% of families and 3.0% of the population were below the poverty line, including 1.7% of those under age 18 and 2.3% of those age 65 or over.

Economy

Forrestal Village is an upscale mixed use lifestyle center located on U.S. Route 1. It was designed by Sasaki Associates of Watertown, Massachusetts with the architectural firm Bower Lewis Thrower/Architects to "create a retail mix that will not just bring people in every few weeks like the regional malls do". 

As of 2022 its tenants are primarily smaller boutique retailers, offices, restaurants, and a hotel. The center has also been approved for residential units. MarketFair in Princeton and Quaker Bridge Mall in Lawrence Township are also a short distance away.

Government

Local government 

Plainsboro Township is governed by a Township Committee form of New Jersey municipal government. The township is one of 141 municipalities (of the 564) statewide governed under this form. The governing body is comprised of a five-member Township Committee whose members are chosen at-large on a partisan basis for three-year terms of office on a staggered basis, with either one or two seats up for vote each year as part of the November general election. Every January 1, the Township Committee re-organizes and selects a mayor and deputy mayor from among its membership. Township Committee meetings are open to the public and held on the second and fourth Wednesday of each month. A Township Administrator appointed by the Township Committee oversees Plainsboro's professional employees. Major departments are Administration, Township Clerk, Finance, Recreation/Cultural Affairs, Municipal Court, Public Safety, Public Works, Planning/Zoning, and Building Inspections, each overseen by a department head.

, members of the Plainsboro Township Committee are Mayor Peter A. Cantu (D, term on committee ends December 31, 2023; terms as mayor ends 2022), Deputy Mayor Neil J. Lewis (D, term on committee ends 2024; term as deputy mayor ends 2022), David Bander (D, 2022), Nuran Nabi (D, 2024) and Edward Yates (D, 2022).

Federal, state and county representation 
Plainsboro Township is located in the 12th Congressional District and is part of New Jersey's 14th state legislative district.

 

Middlesex County is governed by a Board of County Commissioners, whose seven members are elected at-large on a partisan basis to serve three-year terms of office on a staggered basis, with either two or three seats coming up for election each year as part of the November general election. At an annual reorganization meeting held in January, the board selects from among its members a commissioner director and deputy director. , Middlesex County's Commissioners (with party affiliation, term-end year, and residence listed in parentheses) are 
Commissioner Director Ronald G. Rios (D, Carteret, term as commissioner ends December 31, 2024; term as commissioner director ends 2022),
Commissioner Deputy Director Shanti Narra (D, North Brunswick, term as commissioner ends 2024; term as deputy director ends 2022),
Claribel A. "Clary" Azcona-Barber (D, New Brunswick, 2022),
Charles Kenny (D, Woodbridge Township, 2022),
Leslie Koppel (D, Monroe Township, 2023),
Chanelle Scott McCullum (D, Piscataway, 2024) and 
Charles E. Tomaro (D, Edison, 2023).
Constitutional officers are
County Clerk Nancy Pinkin (D, 2025, East Brunswick),
Sheriff Mildred S. Scott (D, 2022, Piscataway) and 
Surrogate Claribel Cortes (D, 2026; North Brunswick).

Politics

As of March 23, 2011, there were a total of 11,460 registered voters in Plainsboro Township, of which 3,884 (33.9%) were registered as Democrats, 1,486 (13.0%) were registered as Republicans and 6,081 (53.1%) were registered as Unaffiliated. There were 9 voters registered as Libertarians or Greens.

In the 2012 presidential election, Democrat Barack Obama received 69.3% of the vote (5,416 cast), ahead of Republican Mitt Romney with 29.3% (2,286 votes), and other candidates with 1.4% (111 votes), among the 7,859 ballots cast by the township's 12,074 registered voters (46 ballots were spoiled), for a turnout of 65.1%. In the 2008 presidential election, Democrat Barack Obama received 70.4% of the vote (5,760 cast), ahead of Republican John McCain with 27.8% (2,280 votes) and other candidates with 1.1% (87 votes), among the 8,187 ballots cast by the township's 11,847 registered voters, for a turnout of 69.1%. In the 2004 presidential election, Democrat John Kerry received 63.4% of the vote (4,603 ballots cast), outpolling Republican George W. Bush with 35.5% (2,575 votes) and other candidates with 0.6% (63 votes), among the 7,261 ballots cast by the township's 10,605 registered voters, for a turnout percentage of 68.5.

In the 2013 gubernatorial election, Republican Chris Christie received 54.9% of the vote (2,232 cast), ahead of Democrat Barbara Buono with 43.4% (1,763 votes), and other candidates with 1.7% (68 votes), among the 4,121 ballots cast by the township's 12,289 registered voters (58 ballots were spoiled), for a turnout of 33.5%. In the 2009 gubernatorial election, Democrat Jon Corzine received 58.7% of the vote (2,478 ballots cast), ahead of Republican Chris Christie with 43.2% (1,823 votes), Independent Chris Daggett with 7.3% (309 votes) and other candidates with 1.2% (51 votes), among the 4,223 ballots cast by the township's 11,142 registered voters, yielding a 37.9% turnout.

Education

Public schools 

Plainsboro Township and West Windsor Township are part of a combined school district, the West Windsor-Plainsboro Regional School District, which serves students in pre-kindergarten through twelfth grade from the two communities. The district has four elementary schools (grades Pre-K/K–3), two upper elementary schools (grades 4 and 5), two middle schools (grades 6–8) and two high schools (grades 9–12). As of the 2020–21 school year, the district, comprised of 10 schools, had an enrollment of 9,386 students and 773.2 classroom teachers (on an FTE basis), for a student–teacher ratio of 12.1:1. Schools in the district (with 2020–21 enrollment data from the National Center for Education Statistics) are 
Dutch Neck Elementary School (located in West Windsor: 704 students; in grades K-3), 
Maurice Hawk Elementary School (West Windsor: 723; K-3), 
Town Center Elementary School (Plainsboro: 431; PreK-2), 
J.V.B. Wicoff Elementary School (Plainsboro: 349; K-3), 
Millstone River School (Plainsboro: 967; 3-5), 
Village School (West Windsor: 617; 4-5), 
Community Middle School (Plainsboro: 1,131; 6-8), 
Thomas R. Grover Middle School (West Windsor: 1,208; 6-8), 
West Windsor-Plainsboro High School North (Plainsboro: 1,521; 9-12) and 
West Windsor-Plainsboro High School South (West Windsor: 1,649; 9-12). The district is overseen by a directly elected nine-member board of education whose members are allocated to the two constituent municipalities based on population, with four of the nine seats allocated to Plainsboro.

In 2005, Community Middle School received first place at the national "Science Olympiad" competition and took first place for a second time in 2007. West Windsor-Plainsboro High School North was the 32nd-ranked public high school, and South was 62nd-ranked, in New Jersey out of 328 schools statewide, in New Jersey Monthly magazine's September 2012 cover story on the state's Top Public High Schools.

Three of the district's schools have been recognized by the National Blue Ribbon Schools Program. West Windsor-Plainsboro High School South was recognized during the 1992–1993 school year and Maurice Hawk Elementary School was recognized in 1993–1994, while West Windsor-Plainsboro High School North was recognized in the 2006–2007 school year.

Eighth grade students from all of Middlesex County are eligible to apply to attend the high school programs offered by the Middlesex County Vocational and Technical Schools, a county-wide vocational school district that offers full-time career and technical education at Middlesex County Academy in Edison, the Academy for Allied Health and Biomedical Sciences in Woodbridge Township and at its East Brunswick, Perth Amboy and Piscataway technical high schools, with no tuition charged to students for attendance.

Private schools 

The campus of the former St. Joseph's Seminary, located in Plainsboro, is home to a number of private schools.
 French American School of Princeton (Pre-K–8)
 The American Boychoir School (closed after 2017–2018 school year)
 The Laurel School
 Wilberforce School, a Classical Christian school. The school had been located in Plainsboro from 2011 to 2014 but permanently located in the former Saint Joseph's seminary in 2019.

Transportation

Roads and highways

Several major transportation routes traverse the township. U.S. Route 1 is a major transportation route that passes through the northwestern part of township. County Route 614 has its western terminus at U.S. Route 1 and passes through the center of Plainsboro.

The closest limited access road is the New Jersey Turnpike (Interstate 95) which is accessible from Interchange 8 in neighboring East Windsor Township and Interchange 8A in Monroe Township.

Public transportation
New Jersey Transit bus service includes the 600, which provides service to Trenton. NJ Transit's Northeast Corridor rail line runs through the township. NJ Transit and Amtrak trains service the township at the nearby Princeton Junction.

Suburban Transit buses 300 line to New York from the Park and Ride in Route 130 provides service directly to Grand Central Terminal in Midtown Manhattan.

Cycling
There are many cycle routes through Plainsboro, connecting the main shopping districts and down to the D&R Canal cycle pathway.  There are a few discontinuities in the cycle routes, but generally they are well-maintained.

Media appearances

 Plainsboro is the namesake of the fictional Princeton-Plainsboro Teaching Hospital in the Fox TV series House.
 Plainsboro is referred to in Tim Curry's song "Paradise Garage" from his album Fearless.
 Plainsboro and the fictional Plainsboro High School are the setting around which the HBO film Rocket Science is based.
 Plainsboro is mentioned in the description of the battle area in Orson Welles's 1938 radio broadcast, The War of the Worlds, when the radio announcer describes the aftermath of the purported Martian invasion at nearby Grover's Mill.
 Plainsboro was featured on the MTV series, True Life ("I'm Graduating from High School") season 11, 2008, on which MTV took a look at the life of three seniors who were enrolled at High School North.
 Plainsboro is the site for the tomb of Elsie the Cow.

Science and research
 From 1986 through 1989, Plainsboro was home to the John von Neumann Center on College Road, which hosted the liquid nitrogen-cooled ETA10 supercomputer, then the world's fastest computer, and was a major hub of the early Internet.
 Plainsboro is home to the Princeton Plasma Physics Laboratory, a laboratory for plasma physics research.
 The National Oceanographic and Atmospheric Administration's Geophysical Fluid Dynamics Laboratory, where the first computer models of climate were developed, is physically located in Plainsboro on the James Forrestal Campus of Princeton University.
 Plainsboro had a nuclear research reactor (on Nuclear Reactor Road) built in 1957.
 In 1930, the Rotolactor was invented by Walker Gordon Farms in Plainsboro.  The Rotolactor was the first rotary milking parlor and a popular tourist attraction. It remained in use into the 1960s.

Notable people

People who were born in, residents of, or otherwise closely associated with Plainsboro Township include:
 David Jordan Bachner (1991–2009), baseball pitcher
 Andrew Bynum (born 1987), former professional basketball player
 Patrick Clark (1955–1998), chef
 Boris Epshteyn (born 1982), political strategist, investment banker and attorney
 Linda R. Greenstein (born 1950), represents the 14th Legislative District in the New Jersey State Senate
 Henry W. Jeffers (1871–1953), one of the leaders in establishing Plainsboro Township, and served as its first mayor after incorporation in 1919
 Gary Jeter (1955–2016), former NFL defensive end who played for the New York Giants, Los Angeles Rams and New England Patriots
 Mariam Nazarian (born 1983), concert pianist and producer, who made her Carnegie Hall debut at the age of 16
 Rebecca Soni (born 1987), U.S. Olympic swimmer and gold medal winner of the 200m breaststroke at the 2008 Summer Olympics in Beijing
 Barbara Wright (born 1933), member of the New Jersey General Assembly who also served as mayor of the township
 Felicia Zhang (born 1993), former pair skater who is a two-time U.S. national medalist and competed at the 2014 Winter Olympics

References

External links

Official Plainsboro web site
West Windsor-Plainsboro School District

School Data for the West Windsor-Plainsboro Regional School District, National Center for Education Statistics
Plainsboro Fire Company
Plainsboro Historical Society
Plainsboro Public Library
Plainsboro Rescue Squad
West Windsor/Plainsboro Today: local online news and chat site
Plainsboro Rescue Squad – volunteer ambulance service

 
1919 establishments in New Jersey
Populated places established in 1919
Township form of New Jersey government
Townships in Middlesex County, New Jersey